Michael Haynes may refer to:

Michael Haynes (defensive lineman) (born 1980), former defensive tackle in the NFL
Michael Haynes (wide receiver) (born 1965), former wide receiver in the NFL
Michael E. Haynes (born 1927), American minister and former politician
Mike Haynes (cornerback)  (born 1953), former NFL cornerback for the Patriots and Raiders
Michael Haynes (wrestler), wrestler, known as Prince Iaukea
Michael Haynes (cricketer) (1936–1997), English cricketer
Mike Haynes (ice hockey), sportscaster
 Michael Haynes, a pseudonym of the train robber Ronald Biggs